Mount Gorman is located on the border of Alberta and British Columbia. It was named in 1925 after A.O. Gorman, a government surveyor with the Dominion Land Survey.

See also
List of peaks on the British Columbia–Alberta border

References

Two-thousanders of Alberta
Two-thousanders of British Columbia
Canadian Rockies